Thiotte is a commune in the Belle-Anse Arrondissement, in the Sud-Est department of Haiti. It has 23,041 inhabitants.

References

Populated places in Sud-Est (department)
Communes of Haiti